Major Benjamin William "Benny" Bawa, KC, VD (1865 – 1923) was a Ceylonese (Sri Lankan) lawyer. He served as the acting Solicitor General of Ceylon, as well as the private secretary and extra aide-de-camp to the Governor of Ceylon.

Early life and education
Bawa's parents were Ahamadu Bawa, a Muslim proctor from Galle, and his French wife, Georgina Mathilda née Ablett. Bawa was educated at S. Thomas' College and Royal College Colombo. He played at the Royal–Thomian and won the Turnour Prize.

Legal career
Practicing law under James Van Langenberg, he was called to bar in 1887. Developing a practice in Kegalle and Colombo, he traveled to England in 1903 entering the Middle Temple and was called to the English Bar in 1904. On his return he developed lucrative legal practices gaining appointment as a King's Counsel. He was a member of the Council of Legal Education.

Military career
He was commissioned as a second lieutenant in the Ceylon Light Infantry in 1899 and was promoted to captain in 1905. While in England he attended the School of Instruction for Officers of the Auxiliary Forces at the Chelsea Barracks. He commanded the Q (Legal) Company of the Ceylon Light Infantry. He was appointed as aide-de-camp (ADC) to Brigadier-General Sir William Manning, Governor of Ceylon, serving as his private secretary until 1923.

Family
Bawa married Bertha Marian Campbell née Schrader, a Dutch Burgher woman who was the daughter of a surgeon from Kandy. His sons were Bevis Bawa, who was appointed ADC to the Governor like his father, and later became a renowned landscaper and Geoffrey Bawa, who also became a lawyer, later becoming a renowned architect.

Death
Bawa was diagnosed with Bright's disease in 1922 and traveled to England for treatment with his family. He died in 1923 while convalescing in Harrogate.

References

External links
 Bawa Ancestry

1865 births
1923 deaths
Alumni of Royal College, Colombo
Alumni of the University of Cambridge
Burgher lawyers
Ceylonese Queen's Counsel
Sri Lankan barristers
Members of Gray's Inn
British Ceylon judges
20th-century King's Counsel
Sri Lankan people of French descent
Ceylon Light Infantry officers